Emmanuel Jorge Ledesma (born 24 May 1988) is an Argentine footballer who plays as an attacking midfielder for Chilean side Barnechea.

Career

Early years as a journeyman
After moving through the youth ranks of Serie A side Genoa, Ledesma joined Queens Park Rangers on a season-long loan in June 2008. Ledesma made a bright start to his career in English football, highlighted by a hat-trick at home to Carlisle in the second round of the League Cup, this coming days after his first and what turned out to be only league goal for QPR in a 2–0 win over Doncaster Rovers. After only a few games at Loftus Road, he had made a good impression on many Queens Park Rangers fans and a limited edition T-shirt was made in his honour. On 2 February 2009 he left QPR by mutual consent to join Serie B side Salernitana in a half-season loan move.

In July 2009 he went to Novara Calcio, on loan from Genoa, with option to sign him in a co-ownership deal. Although he won promotion to Serie B with Novara, in June 2010, the club decided to send him back to Genoa. Ledesma subsequently signed for newly promoted Serie B club, F.C. Crotone, in a co-ownership deal, however, after only half of the season, he returned to Genoa and was released in January 2011.

Following his release by Genoa, Ledesma was offered a trial with Brighton and Hove Albion where, despite scoring on his debut for the reserves, he was not offered a permanent deal. While playing for Brighton reserves, Ledesma was spotted by Walsall, where he successfully completed a trial, and contracted himself to Walsall until the end of the 2010–11 season. Ledesma scored one goal in aiding Walsall's successful survival against relegation, before returning to Argentina to re-join boyhood club Defensa y Justicia. Ledesma returned to England in 2012 and, in March, again signed a contract with Walsall for the remainder of the 2011–12 season.

Signing with Middlesbrough
Ledesma signed a three-year contract with Middlesbrough in July 2012. On 11 August 2012, Ledesma scored on his first competitive game for Middlesbrough, scoring in a 2–1 victory over Bury in the first round of the League Cup. After struggling to establish himself in the first team squad, he added a second goal scored directly from a corner in a 3–1 victory over Preston North End in the third round. Ledesma scored his first league goal for Middlesbrough in a 4–1 win against Charlton Athletic. Ledesma was named in the Championship team of the week after the Charlton match and followed up this strong performance with a man of the match effort against Sheffield Wednesday a week later. He also scored a free kick in a 3–0 home win over Huddersfield Town. After struggling to get amongst the first team again in the 2013/2014 season, Ledesma earned a place in the lineup in December under new manager Aitor Karanka and scored two goals in two games. He scored another long range effort a month later against Charlton Athletic.

On 22 November 2014, it was announced that Ledesma had been recruited on an emergency loan deal to Rotherham United until January 2015. He made his debut as a half-time substitute the same day in a 1–0 loss to Birmingham City.

International journeyman
Following his release by Middlesbrough, on 2 July 2015 Ledesma signed a one-year deal with Championship side Rotherham United.

On 9 August 2016, Ledesma joined Championship club Brentford on non-contract terms, but after just two appearances, he departed for Superleague Greece club Panetolikos. On 24 December 2016, Panetolikos and Ledesma parted ways.

On 23 March 2017, Ledesma joined North American Soccer League side New York Cosmos.

FC Cincinnati

Ledesma signed with United Soccer League side FC Cincinnati on 4 January 2018. He was a key player for Cincinnati in the 2018 season, earning 16 goals and a new league record of 16 assists. He was named USL Player of the Month twice (June and September) and appeared on the USL Team of the Week ten times. Following the end of the season, he was named the USL Most Valuable Player of 2018, chosen by a vote of media members and team management.

In May 2018, Major League Soccer announced that FC Cincinnati would be joining the league in 2019, meaning a new roster would be formed. A journalist for ESPN first reported that Ledesma had signed to the new MLS roster in October 2018, but this was not confirmed until the league officially announced his signing on 26 November 2018. Ledesma was the fourth of ten players from the 2018 roster to be named to the MLS roster.

SJK
Ledesma signed with Veikkausliiga side SJK on 19 August 2020. The contract was terminated on 24 June 2021.

Indy Eleven
In September 2021, Ledesma returned to the USL Championship by signing with Indy Eleven. Following the 2021 season, it was announced that Ledesma's contract option was declined by Indy Eleven.

Barnechea
In July 2022, he moved to Chile and joined Barnechea in the Primera B.

Career statistics

References

External links
 
 
 http://aic.football.it/scheda/21051/ledesma-emmanuel-jorge.htm

1988 births
Living people
People from Quilmes
Argentine footballers
Argentine expatriate footballers
Association football midfielders
Genoa C.F.C. players
Queens Park Rangers F.C. players
U.S. Salernitana 1919 players
Novara F.C. players
F.C. Crotone players
Walsall F.C. players
Defensa y Justicia footballers
Middlesbrough F.C. players
Rotherham United F.C. players
Brighton & Hove Albion F.C. players
Brentford F.C. players
Panetolikos F.C. players
New York Cosmos (2010) players
FC Cincinnati players
Seinäjoen Jalkapallokerho players
Indy Eleven players
A.C. Barnechea footballers
Serie A players
English Football League players
Serie B players
Serie C players
Primera Nacional players
Super League Greece players
North American Soccer League players
USL Championship players
Major League Soccer players
Veikkausliiga players
Primera B de Chile players
Expatriate footballers in Italy
Expatriate footballers in England
Expatriate footballers in Greece
Expatriate footballers in Finland
Expatriate footballers in Chile
Argentine expatriate sportspeople in Italy
Argentine expatriate sportspeople in England
Argentine expatriate sportspeople in Greece
Argentine expatriate sportspeople in Finland
Argentine expatriate sportspeople in Chile
Sportspeople from Buenos Aires Province